is a terminus on the Osaka Metro Sennichimae Line in Fukushima-ku, Osaka, Japan.

The station name "Nodahanshin" was originally a name of tram stop of a former municipal streetcar line and means "Hanshin Railway Noda Station".

Layout

This station is located under the ground level. It has 2 side platforms serving a track each on the third basement. 
Ticket gates are located in the center east and the center west: the former connects to Platform 1 for entrance and exit by stairs and an elevator, and the latter connect from Platform 2 for exit by stairs only. The north gate and the south gate were closed and the center west gate became in use on March 27, 2020.

Since platform 2 is used for arriving services only, automatic platform gates are not used on that platform.

Surroundings
the headquarters of Hanshin Electric Railway Co., Ltd.
WISTE
Fukushima Ward Office
Osaka Prefectural Fukushima Police Station
Osaka Municipal Fukushima Library
Japan National Route 2

References 

Fukushima-ku, Osaka
Railway stations in Osaka
Railway stations in Japan opened in 1969
Osaka Metro stations